Imerovigli is a village on the island of Santorini, Greece, situated north of the island capital Fira. Imerovigli is built on the rim of the Santorini caldera and is crossed by narrow, paved paths. 

Imerovigli's churches are all made in the Cycladic architectural style. They include the church of Ai-Stratis, in the centre of the village, and the Monastery of Saint Nikolaos, on the path connecting Imerovigli to Fira. On nearby Skaros Rock are the remains of a Venetian Castle built in 1207 by Marco Sanudo, then ruler of all the Cyclades.

Imerovigli has 470 permanent inhabitants.

Santorini
Populated places in Thira (regional unit)